This article lists the soundtracks attributed to the series Tenjho Tenge.

Tenjho Tenge - Great Disc 1
The Tenjho Tenge original soundtracks by various artists. It was arranged by DJ Fumiya and composed by Fumihiko. The album was released in Japan by Avex on September 29, 2004, and was released in North America by Geneon.

Bomb A Head!V
Tenjho Tenge Single by the artist m.c.A.T. It was arranged by DJ Fumiya and composed by Akio Togashi. It was released in Japan on August 18, 2004, by Avex.

Tenjo Tenge Character Collection EXTRA BOUT.1
Tenjho Tenge first character collection album by various artists. It was composed by Yupa. It was released in Japan on January 19, 2005, by Avex.

Tenjo Tenge Character Collection EXTRA BOUT.2
Tenjho Tenge second character collection album by various artists. It was composed by Decky-Kenji. It was released in Japan on January 19, 2005, by Avex.

References

External links

 Tenjho Tenge GREAT DISC1 - CDJapan
 Bomb A Head! V - CDJapan
 Tenjho Tenge Character Collection EXTRA BOUT.1 - CDJapan
 Tenjho Tenge Character Collection EXTRA BOUT.2 - CDJapan

Music
Avex Group albums
Anime soundtracks
Film and television discographies
Discographies of Japanese artists